Jutta Armelle Zilliacus (born 25 July 1925) is a Finnish-born ethnic Estonian journalist and author in the Swedish language. She was also a politician, and served as a Member of Parliament for the Swedish People's Party for Helsinki from 1975 to 1986 and a member of the Helsinki City Council from 1968 to 1984.

Books
 Rökringar (1970)
 Innan du vet ordet av (1975)
 En bit av Det stora äpplet (1978)
 Vägskäl (1986)
 Annorlunda barndom (1986)
 Vändpunkt (1987)
 Gå över gränser (1991)
 Balansgång (1994)
 Ajatuksia verannalla (1997)
 Underbart är kort (1997)
 I väntan på buss nummer 16 (2002)

References

1925 births
Living people
Writers from Helsinki
Finnish people of Estonian descent
Swedish People's Party of Finland politicians
Members of the Parliament of Finland (1975–79)
Members of the Parliament of Finland (1979–83)
Members of the Parliament of Finland (1983–87)
Finnish journalists
Finnish writers in Swedish
Recipients of the Order of the Cross of Terra Mariana, 4th Class
Finnish women journalists